Yardbird Suite is an album by American jazz flautist Herbie Mann featuring tracks recorded in 1957 for the Savoy label.

Reception

Allmusic awarded the album 4 stars stating "this is a solid document of all of the participants' burgeoning skills, and increasing cache as modern jazz masters".

Track listing
 "Yardbird Suite" (Charlie Parker) - 5:52
 "Here's That Mann" (Eddie Costa) - 4:22
 "One for Tubby" (Joe Puma) - 6:04
 "Squire's Parlor" (Phil Woods) - 4:48
 "Who Knew?" (Puma) - 7:08
 "Opicana" (Puma) - 5:24

Personnel 
Herbie Mann - flute, tenor saxophone
Phil Woods - alto saxophone
Eddie Costa - piano, vibraphone
Joe Puma - guitar
Wendell Marshall - bass
Bobby Donaldson - drums

References 

1957 albums
Herbie Mann albums
Albums produced by Ozzie Cadena
Albums recorded at Van Gelder Studio
Savoy Records albums